Mehmet İncebacak (born 9 February 1991) is a Turkish professional footballer who plays as a midfielder for Manisaspor.

References

1991 births
Living people
Turkish footballers
Bucaspor footballers
Kahramanmaraşspor footballers
Turgutluspor footballers
Süper Lig players
TFF First League players
TFF Second League players
People from Konak
Footballers from İzmir

Association football defenders